Wells Peak is a granitic mountain summit with an elevation of  located in Yosemite National Park, in Tuolumne County, California, United States. The peak is situated between Stubblefield and Thompson canyons in the Sierra Nevada mountain range. Precipitation runoff from this landform drains southwest to Hetch Hetchy via Rancheria Creek.

History
Wells Peak was named in the 1890s by R. B. Marshall of the USGS to honor Rush Spencer Wells (1874–1951), US Army officer. The US Army had jurisdiction over Yosemite National Park from 1891 to 1914, and each summer 150 cavalrymen traveled from the Presidio of San Francisco to patrol the park. This landform's toponym was officially adopted by the U.S. Board on Geographic Names in 1932.

The first ascent of the summit was made July 27, 1945, by Arthur J. Reyman.

Climate
According to the Köppen climate classification system, Wells Peak is located in an alpine climate zone. Most weather fronts originate in the Pacific Ocean and travel east toward the Sierra Nevada mountains. As fronts approach, they are forced upward by the peaks (orographic lift), causing moisture in the form of rain or snowfall to drop onto the range.

See also

 Geology of the Yosemite area
 Tuolumne Intrusive Suite

References

External links
 Weather forecast: Wells Peak
 Rush Spencer Wells (photo)

Mountains of Tuolumne County, California
North American 3000 m summits
Mountains of Northern California
Sierra Nevada (United States)
Mountains of Yosemite National Park
Mountains of the Sierra Nevada (United States)